Sololá is a department in the west of Guatemala. The capital is the city of Sololá.  Lake Atitlan is a key feature surrounded by a number of the municipalities.

Municipalities 

 Concepción
 Nahualá
 Panajachel
 San Andrés Semetabaj
 San Antonio Palopó
 San José Chacayá
 San Juan La Laguna
 San Lucas Tolimán
 San Marcos La Laguna
 San Pablo La Laguna
 San Pedro La Laguna
 Santa Catarina Ixtahuacan
 Santa Catarina Palopó
 Santa Clara La Laguna
 Santa Cruz La Laguna
 Santa Lucía Utatlán
 Santa María Visitación
 Santiago Atitlán
 Sololá

Population
As of 2018, the department had a population of 421,583. The area is populated almost entirely by different Mayan ethnic groups, of which the two largest groups are the Kaqchikel people and K'iche'. Kaqchikel people accounted for 50.1% of the department's population, and K'iche' accounted for 35.3%. Indigenous people in total account for 96.5% of the department's population.

Economy
With fertile soil, Sololá farmers produce maize, wheat, barley, vegetables, and fruit. Fruits include apples, cherries, cherimoya, peaches, and pears. Livestock is also common, including sheep. Since 1850, the region has had a large wool industry.

Ecology
The area is mountainous. In 1850, the British described it as having a "healthy" climate "rather inclining to cold, or...temperate." Temperatures warm further south. Lago de Atitlán is located in Sololá.

Sports
Saprissa de Guatemala is Solola's main football team and the most famous club in the department.

References

 
Departments of Guatemala